The Hanover Street Baptist Church was the first Baptist church in Dunedin, New Zealand. It is no longer used for worship and has been renamed Hanover Hall.

The present building, the second for the congregation, was designed by Edmund Anscombe (1874–1948) and completed in 1912.

Initially Dunedin Baptists worshipped with other Free Church groups until they established themselves in a building of their own. The church and its Sunday school were founded in 1863. A Superintendent of Otago Thomas Dick (1823–1900) was one of the initial trustees. Dr William Purdie, an Edinburgh graduate and an early and distinguished medical practitioner in Dunedin, was a founding father.

A number of notable politicians and other well-known New Zealanders have been connected with the church including Dame Silvia Cartwright, a former Governor-General of New Zealand, who spent most of her younger years in Dunedin.

The congregation moved to another site in 1996. The building was unoccupied for a couple of years before being turned into a series of short lived restaurants and nightclubs.

The structure is a fine design and was provided with good stained glass windows, some of which were removed when it was converted from a church to a bar. The present floor is apparently built some three feet above the original. While the overhead balcony pews appear to be intact they do not seem to be in good condition.

One of the most interesting features is a pipe organ, which is believed to be only the second of its kind in New Zealand. (The other is at the Dunedin Town Hall.) The instrument has not been serviced for some time and it is uncertain whether it is in working condition. There is a bell tower, a prominent feature of the locality.

The building has been classified a Category I historic place by Heritage New Zealand, with registration number 4792. It needs attention to restore its original character.

Until the mid-2010s it was occupied by a business called The Monkey Bar, and bore related signage until October 2018. In 2016 it was purchased by a local couple for the purpose of housing the Dunedin Symphony Orchestra and was officially reopened for this purpose and renamed "Hanover Hall" in November 2018 by the Prime Minister of New Zealand, Jacinda Ardern.

References

Further reading

Churches in Dunedin
Heritage New Zealand Category 1 historic places in Otago
Baptist churches in New Zealand
Edmund Anscombe buildings
Listed churches in New Zealand
1910s architecture in New Zealand